Yungnulgra County is one of the 141 Cadastral divisions of New South Wales.

The name Yungnulgra is believed to be derived from a local Aboriginal word and is also the name used for Yungnulgra Plains.

Parishes within this county
A full list of parishes found within this county; their current LGA and mapping coordinates to the approximate centre of each location is as follows:

References

External links 
 Historic map of Yungnulgra County

Counties of New South Wales